The 1962 United States Senate election in Georgia took place on November 5, 1962. Incumbent Democratic U.S. Senator Herman Talmadge was re-elected to a second consecutive term in office, winning large victories in the primary and general elections.

At this time, Georgia was a one-party state. Talmadge's victory in the September 12 primary was tantamount to election, and he was unopposed in the general election.

Democratic primary

Candidates
 Henry M. Henderson
 Herman Talmadge, incumbent U.S. Senator since 1957

Results

General election

Results

See also 
 1962 United States Senate elections

References

Single-candidate elections
1962
Georgia
United States Senate